In common law systems, land tenure, from the French verb "tenir" means "to hold", is the legal regime in which land owned by an individual is possessed by someone else who is said to "hold" the land, based on an agreement between both individuals. It determines who can use land, for how long and under what conditions. Tenure may be based both on official laws and policies, and on informal local customs (insofar higher law does allow that).  In other words, land tenure implies a system according to which land is held by an individual or the actual tiller of the land but this person does not have legal ownership.
It determines the holder's rights and responsibilities in connection with their holding. The sovereign monarch, known in England as The Crown, held land in its own right. All land holders are either its tenants or sub-tenants. Tenure signifies a legal relationship between tenant and lord, arranging the duties and rights of tenant and lord in relationship to the land. Over history, many different forms of land tenure, i.e., ways of holding land, have been established.

A landowner is the holder of the estate in land with the most extensive and exclusive rights of ownership over the territory, simply put, the owner of land.

Feudal tenure

The legal concept of land tenure in the Middle Ages has become known as the feudal system that has been widely used throughout what now is Europe, the Middle East and Asia Minor. The lords who received land directly from the Crown, or another landowner, in exchange for certain rights and obligations were called tenants-in-chief. 

They doled out portions of their land to lesser tenants who in turn divided it among even lesser tenants. This process—that of granting subordinate tenancies—is known as subinfeudation. In this way, all individuals except the monarch did hold the land "of" someone else because legal ownership was with the (superior) monarch, also known as 
overlord or 
suzerain.

Historically, it was usual for there to be reciprocal duties and rights between lord and tenant. There were different kinds of tenure to fit various kinds of need. For instance, a military tenure might be by knight-service, requiring the tenant to supply the lord with a number of armed horsemen and ground troops. 

The fees were often lands, land revenue or revenue-producing real property, typically known as fiefs or fiefdoms. Over the ages and depending on the region a broad variety of customs did develop based on the same legal principle. The famous Magna Carta for instance was a legal contract based on the medieval system of land tenure.

The concept of tenure has since evolved into other forms, such as leases and estates.

Modes of ownership and tenure 
There is a great variety of modes of land ownership and tenure.

Traditional land tenure
Most of the indigenous nations or tribes of North America had differing notions of land ownership.  Whereas European land ownership centered around control, Indigenous notions were based on stewardship.  When Europeans first came to North America, they sometimes disregarded traditional land tenure and simply seized land, or they accommodated traditional land tenure by recognizing it as aboriginal title. This theory formed the basis for treaties with indigenous peoples.

Ownership of land by swearing to make productive use of it

In several developing countries, such as Egypt and Senegal, this method is still presently in use. In Senegal, it is mentioned as "mise en valeur des zones du terroir" and in Egypt, it is called Wadaa al-yad.

Allodial title
Allodial title is a system in which real property is owned absolutely free and clear of any superior landlord or sovereign.  True allodial title is rare, with most property ownership in the common law world (Australia, Canada, Ireland, New Zealand, United Kingdom, United States) being in fee simple. Allodial title is inalienable, in that it may be conveyed, devised, gifted, or mortgaged by the owner, but it may not be distressed and restrained for collection of taxes or private debts, or condemned (eminent domain) by the government.

Feudal land tenure
Feudal land tenure is a system of mutual obligations under which a royal or noble personage granted a fiefdom — some degree of interest in the use or revenues of a given parcel of land — in exchange for a claim on services such as military service or simply maintenance of the land in which the lord continued to have an interest.  This pattern obtained from the level of high nobility as vassals of a monarch down to lesser nobility whose only vassals were their serfs.

Fee simple
Under common law,  Fee simple is the most complete ownership interest one can have in real property, other than the rare Allodial title. The holder can typically freely sell or otherwise transfer that interest or use it to secure a mortgage loan. This picture of "complete ownership" is, of course, complicated by the obligation in most places to pay a property tax and by the fact that if the land is mortgaged, there will be a claim on it in the form of a lien.  In modern societies, this is the most common form of land ownership. Land can also be owned by more than one party and there are various concurrent estate rules.

Native title
In Australia, native title is a common law concept that recognizes that some indigenous people have certain land rights that derive from their traditional laws and customs. Native title can co-exist with non-indigenous proprietary rights and in some cases different indigenous groups can exercise their native title over the same land. There are approximately 160 registered determinations of native title, spanning some 16% of Australia's land mass. The case of Mabo overturned the decision in Milirrpum and repudiated the notion of terra nullius. Subsequent Parliamentary Acts passed recognised the existence of this common law doctrine.

Life estate
Under common law, Life estate is an interest in real property that ends at death.  The holder has the use of the land for life, but typically no ability to transfer that interest or to use it to secure a mortgage loan.

Fee tail
Under common law, fee tail is hereditary, non-transferable ownership of real property.  A similar concept, the legitime, exists in civil and Roman law; the legitime limits the extent to which one may disinherit an heir.

Leasehold
Under both common law and civil law, land may be leased or rented by its owner to another party.  A wide range of arrangements are possible, ranging from very short terms to the 99-year leases common in the United Kingdom, and allowing various degrees of freedom in the use of the property.

Common land
Rights to use a common may include such rights as the use of a road or the right to graze one's animals on commonly owned land.

Sharecropping
When sharecropping, one has use of agricultural land owned by another person in exchange for a share of the resulting crop or livestock.

Easement
Easements allow one to make certain specific uses of land owned by someone else. The most classic easement is right-of-way, but it could also include (for example) the right to run an electrical power line across someone else's land.

Other
In addition, there are various forms of collective ownership, which typically take either the form of membership in a cooperative, or shares in a corporation, which owns the land (typically by fee simple, but possibly under other arrangements). There are also various hybrids; in many communist states, government ownership of most agricultural land has combined in various ways with tenure for farming collectives.

Land tenure in archaeology 
In archaeology, traditions of land tenure can be studied according to territoriality and through the ways in which people create and utilize landscape boundaries, both natural and constructed. Less tangible aspects of tenure are harder to qualify, and study of these relies heavily on either the anthropological record (in the case of pre-literate societies) or textual evidence (in the case of literate societies).

In archaeology, land tenure traditions can be studied across the longue durée, for example land tenure based on kinship and collective property management. This makes it possible to study the long-term consequences of change and development in land tenure systems and agricultural productivity.

Moreover, an archaeological approach to land tenure arrangements studies the temporal aspects of land governance, including their sometimes temporary, impermanent and negotiable aspects as well as uses of past forms of tenure. For example, people can lay claim to, or profess to own resources, through reference to ancestral memory within society. In these cases, the nature of and relationships with aspects of the past, both tangible (e.g. monuments) and intangible (e.g. concepts of history through story telling) are used to legitimize the present.

Land tenure by country

Angola

Afghanistan 
41 of the Constitution of Afghanistan, foreigners are not allowed to own land. Foreign individuals shall not have the right to own immovable property in Afghanistan

Canada

China 
Land in China is state-owned or collectively owned. Enterprises, farmers, and householders lease land from the state using long-term leases of 20 to 70 years. Foreign investors are not allowed to buy or own land in China.

Thailand 
In Thailand foreigners are prohibited to own or possess land in Thailand.

Cambodia 
Under Article 44 of the Cambodian Constitution, “only natural persons or legal entities of Khmer nationality shall have the right to land ownership.” foreigners are prohibited to own or possess land in Cambodia.

Philippines 
Foreigners are prohibited owning land in the Philippines under the 1987 Constitution.

Indonesia 
Foreigners are not allowed to own freehold land in Indonesia.

Vietnam 
Foreigners cannot buy and own land, like in many other Southeast Asian countries. Instead, the land is collectively owned by all Vietnamese people, but governed by the state. As written in the national Land Law, foreigners and foreign organizations are allowed to lease land. The leasehold period is up to 50 years.

Burma 
Though purchase of land is not permitted to foreigners, a real estate investor may apply for a 70 year leasehold with a Myanmar Investment Commission (MIC) permit.

Belarus 
According to the legislation of Belarus, a foreign citizen cannot own land and only has the right to rent it.

Laos 
As foreigners are prohibited from permanent ownership of land. Foreigners can only lease land for a period of up to 30 year.

Mongolia 
Only Mongolian citizens can own the land within the territory of Mongolia. foreign citizens can only lease the land.

Maldives 
Foreigners are not allowed to own freehold land in Maldives. the land can only be leased to foreigners for 99 years.

Sri Lanka 
In 2014, the Sri Lankan parliament passed a law banning land purchases by foreigners. The new act will allow foreigners to acquire land only on a lease basis of up to 99 years with an annual 15 percent tax on the total rental paid upfront.

Georgia 
Since 2017, A ban on foreigners owning farmland was introduced in the Georgia's new constitution. The new constitution states that, with a small number of exceptions, agricultural land can only be owned by the state, a Georgian citizen or a Georgian-owned entity.

Kazakhstan 
In 2021, President Kassym-Jomart Tokayev signed into law a bill that bans the selling and leasing of agricultural land to foreigners.

Israel 
Approximately 7% of the allocated land in Israel is privately owned. The rest, i.e. 93%, is owned by the State and is known as “Israeli Land”. Israel’s Basic Law on real estate states that Israel’s Land is jointly owned by the State (69%), the Development Authority (12%), and the Jewish National Fund (12%).

Ireland 
 Land and Conveyancing Law Reform Bill, 2006

United Kingdom

England and Wales 
Land tenure in England
English land law
History of English land law

Scotland 
 Crofting
 Aoghairean
 Half-foot

United States

Importance of tenure today 

With homelessness and wealth inequality on the rise, land tenure in the developed world has become a point of issue.  Market-based economies which treat housing as a commodity and not a right allow for laws such as California Proposition 13 (1978) that incentivize treating housing as an investment. Due to inelastic demand of the human need for shelter, housing prices can therefore be raised above universally-affordable rates. This complicates tenure by limiting supply and exacerbating homelessness and informal housing arrangements.  For instance, in the United States, minimal regulation on house flipping and rent-seeking behavior allows for gentrification, pricing out half a million Americans and leaving them homeless. This is in light of 17 million homes left vacant as investment vehicles of the wealthy.

At the same time, severe weather events caused by climate-change have become more frequent, affecting property values.

In the developing world, catastrophes are impacting greater numbers of people due to urbanization, crowding, and weak tenure and legal systems.

Colonial land-tenure systems have led to issues in post-colonial societies.

The concepts of "landlord" and "tenant" have been recycled to refer to the modern relationship of the parties to land which is held under a lease. Professor F.H. Lawson in Introduction to the Laws of Property (1958) has pointed out, however, that the landlord-tenant relationship never really fitted in the feudal system and was rather an "alien commercial element".

The doctrine of tenure did not apply to personalty (personal property). However, the relationship of bailment in the case of chattels closely resembles the landlord-tenant relationship that can be created in land.

Secure land-tenure also recognizes one's legal residential status in urban areas and it is a key characteristic in slums. Slum-dwellers do not have legal title to the land and thus local governments usually marginalize and ignored them.

In 2012, the Committee on World Food Security based at the Food and Agriculture Organization (FAO) of the United Nations, endorsed the Voluntary Guidelines on the Responsible Governance of Tenure as the global norm, as the problem of poor and politically marginalized especially likely to suffer from insecure tenure, however, this is merely work in progress. The United Nations Sustainable Development Goal 5 also advocates for reforms to give women access to ownership and control over land in recognition of the importance of tenure to resource distribution.

See also 

 Alienated land
 Allodial title
 Apertura feudi
 Development easement
 Eminent domain
 Feudalism
 Fiefdom
 Flexible Land Tenure System (Namibia)
 History of English land law
 Homestead principle
 Land (economics)
 Land administration
 Land grabbing
 Landed gentry
 Landed nobility
 Landed property
 Land reform
 Land titling
 Land trust
 Lord paramount
 Manorialism
 Mesne lord
 Open field system
 Possession (law)
 Precaria
 Quia Emptores
 Rights and Resources Initiative
 Squatting
 Tenement (law)
 Title (property)
 Usucaption

References

Further reading
 John Baker, An Introduction to English Legal History (3rd edition) 1990 Butterworths. 

 
Real property law

ru:Землевладение